, born December 18, 1972, is a Japanese actor, talent and saxophone player. He has had notable roles in such works as The Incite Mill, Kyō Kara Hitman and Tokyo Eyes.

Filmography

Film

Television

Dubbing
Rambo: Last Blood, Hugo Martinez (Sergio Peris-Mencheta)

References

External links

Shinji Takeda's Abstract Jazz Lounge

1972 births
Living people
20th-century Japanese male actors
21st-century Japanese male actors
Japanese male film actors
Japanese male television actors
Japanese male voice actors
People from Sapporo